Harald Feller (1913, Switzerland – 2003) was a Swiss diplomat who saved Hungarian Jews during the Holocaust, for which he was honored by Yad Vashem as one of the Righteous Among the Nations in 1999.

He replaced Maximilian Jaeger (c. 1915 – 1999) as head of the Swiss legation in Budapest, Hungary, in 1944. He supported Carl Lutz with the rescue of Jews under Swiss protection. Feller worked closely with the other neutral legations in constantly pressuring the Horthy and Sztójay governments to end the persecution and deportations of Jews. Feller protected members of the Swedish legation, who were targeted by the Arrow Cross Party, by giving them false Swiss passports and providing shelter. Toward the end of the war, Feller hid dozens of Jews in the basement of his consular residence in Budapest.

In February 1945, the Soviets arrested Feller and Maximilian Jaeger and sent him to Moscow, along with other Swiss nationals. They both were returned to Switzerland in February 1946 in exchange for two pilots who defected to Switzerland.

See also 
Raoul Wallenberg

References

External links 
 Raoul Wallenberg foundation

Swiss Righteous Among the Nations
Swiss diplomats
Jewish Hungarian history
Swiss expatriates in Hungary
1913 births
2003 deaths